The pig-tailed macaques are two macaque sister species. They look almost identical and are best distinguished by their parapatric ranges:

 Northern pig-tailed macaque, Macaca leonina (Bangladesh to Vietnam, south to northern Malaysia)
 Southern pig-tailed macaque or beruk, Macaca nemestrina (Northern Malaysia and southern Thailand to Borneo and western Indonesia)